Erich Estiaan de Jager (born ) is a South African professional rugby union player for the New England Free Jacks of Major League Rugby (MLR). His regular position is prop. His nickname is "Tarzan" started by his teammates.

Rugby career

Youth rugby

De Jager was born in Port Elizabeth and represented the local  at various youth levels during his school career, playing at the Under-18 Craven Week tournaments on two occasions – at the 2013 tournament held in Polokwane and the 2014 event held in Middelburg.

After school, De Jager moved to Bloemfontein, where he joined the  academy, playing for them at Under-19 level in 2015, and at Under-21 level in 2016 and 2017. He also made a few appearances for the  team in 2016.

First class rugby

In 2020, de Jager signed with the New England Free Jacks of Major League Rugby through to the 2022 season.

References

South African rugby union players
Living people
1996 births
Rugby union players from Port Elizabeth
Rugby union props
Cheetahs (rugby union) players
Free State Cheetahs players
Western Province (rugby union) players
New England Free Jacks players
Griquas (rugby union) players